Bahder Djohan (30 July 1902 – 8 March 1981) was an Indonesian politician who served as the 6th Minister of Education and Culture of Indonesia. He served in the Natsir and Wilopo Cabinets.

Background 
Bahder Djohan was the 5 10 children of Mohamad Rapal (Soetan Boerhanoedin) and Lisah. Bahder's father was a prosecutor. Bahder Djohan was styled Marah Besar when marrying Siti Zairi Yaman.

Education 
Bahder initially attended a Malay school in Kampung Pondok, Padang. In 1910, he followed his father to Payakumbuh. In 1913, Bahder attended 1e Klasse Inlandsche School (First Class Indies School) in Bukittinggi. There, he met Mohammad Hatta, later became his close friend. He only attended school in Bukittinggi for two years before moving to Hollands-Indische School (Dutch Indies School) in Padang. In 1917, Bahder completed his education in HIS and continued his education to Meer Uitgebreid Lager Onderwijs (junior high school) in the same city.
 
In 1919, Bahder attended STOVIA in Batavia (now Jakarta) for 8 years, and lived in a dormitory located in the faculty complex. In November 12, 1927, he graduated from STOVIA and received his medical degree.

Career
In his youth, Bahder was one of Jong Sumatranen Bond's leader. He was actively involved in Youth Pledge. In the First Youth Pledge, Bahder delivered a speech about women's position. His speech "Di Tangan Wanita (In the Hand of Women) was banned by Dutch colonial government.

In the Independence era, Bahder was elected Minister of Education and Culture in Natsir (1950–1951) and Wilopo Cabinet (1952–1953). In 1953, he was appointed President of Central Hospital of Jakarta (now Cipto Mangunkusumo National Central Hospital). Then, he was elected Rector of University of Indonesia, however in 1958, before his term of office ended, Bahder resigned following his disagreement with Indonesian government suppressing Revolutionary Government of the Republic of Indonesia by means of war.

Scouting
In September 1951 thirteen of the stronger Scouting organizations met and decided to found a federating body to satisfy national and international needs. Ikatan Pandu Indonesia – Ipindo for short – came into being. Tuan Soemardjo was elected chief commissioner, and Dr. Djohan, an old Scout, became honorary President.

Bibliography
 Djohan, Bahder, Bahder Djohan Pengabdi Kemanusiaan, PT Gunung Agung, Jakarta, 1980
 Hatta, Mohammad, Mohammad Hatta Memoir, Tinta Mas Jakarta, 1979

Footnotes 

 
 

 
 

1902 births
1981 deaths
People from Padang
Minangkabau people
Government ministers of Indonesia
University of Indonesia rectors
STOVIA alumni